Mark O'Shea may refer to:
Mark O'Shea (herpetologist) (born 1956)
Mark O'Shea (musician) (born 1977)